Ptychobela nodulosa is a species of sea snail, a marine gastropod mollusk in the family Pseudomelatomidae, the turrids and allies.

Description
The length of the shell varies between 34 mm and 50 mm.

Distribution
This marine species occurs off Western Australia; also found off Western India

References

  Gmelin J.F. 1791. Caroli a Linné. Systema Naturae per regna tria naturae, secundum classes, ordines, genera, species, cum characteribus, differentiis, synonymis, locis. Lipsiae : Georg. Emanuel. Beer Vermes. Vol. 1(Part 6) pp. 3021–3910. [officially regarded by the ICZN Opinion 296 (26 Oct 1954) as the 13th edition of Systema Naturae] 
 Lamarck, J.B.P.A. de M. 1816. Liste des objets représentés dans les planches de cette livraison. pp. 1-16 in Lamarck, J.B.P.A. de M. Tableau encyclopédique et méthodique des trois règnes de la nature. Vers, coquilles, mollusques et polypiers. Paris : Agasse Part 23 pp. 1-16, pls 391-488.
 Lamarck, J.B.P.A. de M. 1822. Histoire naturelle des Animaux sans Vertèbres. Paris : J.B. Lamarck Vol. 7 711 pp.
 Thiele, J. 1925. Gastropoda der Deutschen Tiefsee-Expedition. II. Teil. pp. in Chun, C. Wissenschaftliche Ergebnisse der Deutschen Tiefsee-Expedition auf dem Damfper "Valdivia" 1898–1899. Jena : Gustav Fischer Vol. 17(2) 348 pp., 34 pls.
 Powell, A.W.B. 1966. The molluscan families Speightiidae and Turridae, an evaluation of the valid taxa, both Recent and fossil, with list of characteristic species. Bulletin of the Auckland Institute and Museum. Auckland, New Zealand 5: 1–184, pls 1–23
 Taylor, J. D. (1982). Diets of sublittoral predatory gastropods of Hong Kong. In: Proceedings of the first international marine biological workshop: The marine flora and fauna of Hong Kong and southern China (ed. Morton, B.), vol. 2, pp907-920. Hong Kong University Press, Hong Kong.
 Wells, F.E. 1994. A revision of the Recent Australian species of the turrid genera Inquisitor and Ptychobela. Journal of the Malacological Society of Australasia 15: 71-102 
 Wilson, B. 1994. Australian marine shells. Prosobranch gastropods. Kallaroo, WA : Odyssey Publishing Vol. 2 370 pp.

External links
 
 Smith E.A. (1877). Diagnoses of new species of Pleurotomidae in the British Museum. Annals and Magazine of Natural History. ser. 4, 19: 488-501

nodulosa
Gastropods described in 1791
Gastropods of Australia